The British Rail Class 390 Pendolino is a type of electric high-speed passenger train operated by Avanti West Coast in the United Kingdom, leased from Angel Trains. They are electric multiple units using Fiat Ferroviaria's tilting train Pendolino technology and built by Alstom. Fifty-three units were originally built between 2001 and 2004 for operation on the West Coast Main Line (WCML). They were ordered as eight-car units, later extended to nine cars, of which some were then lengthened further to 11 cars. These new 11-car trains were renumbered as the subclass 390/1. The trains of the original batch were the last to be assembled at Alstom's Washwood Heath plant, before its closure in 2005. The remaining trains in the fleet were built in Italy.

The fleet is maintained at Longsight TMD near  station.

From 2021, a refurbishment program to upgrade the fleet to “as new” condition was begun, involving conversion of one first-class carriage to standard class to increase capacity, power plugs and new customer information screens among other upgrades.

Background

During 1997, private operator Virgin Rail Group started operating the InterCity West Coast franchise, taking over from state-owned operator British Rail. Virgin had been awarded the franchise having made a commitment to replace the locomotives and rolling stock in use on the route, namely the British Rail Class 86, 87 and 90 electric locomotives and Mark 2 and Mark 3 coaching stock, with brand new tilting trains. Following negotiations with several manufacturers, Virgin placed an order with Alstom/Fiat Ferroviaria to produce the envisioned tilting train, which was known by the name Pendolino and was later designated under TOPS as the Class 390.

The purpose of tilt on the Pendolino was to maintain passenger comfort levels when traversing curves at high speed by reducing the sideways forces on the train's occupants, minimising their tendency to slide across the carriage. The train was designed to be visually impressive: the concept design for the Pendolino was originally produced by industrial design firm Priestman Goode in cooperation with JHL and Start Design and many aspects of the finished product, such as the shaping of its aerodynamic nose and much of the train's interior areas, can be attributed to them.

The concept of deploying tilting trains on the West Coast Main Line was not an original one. During the 1980s and 1990s, British Rail had developed several plans to introduce new trains and pursued the development of the revolutionary, but ultimately unsuccessful, Class 370 Advanced Passenger Train (APT) for a protracted period. Some years after the cancellation of the APT, British Rail had intended to replace the existing fleet of trains on the West Coast Main Line (in conjunction with a planned route modernisation) as part of the InterCity 250 project, but this was cancelled by the government shortly before the Privatisation of British Rail during the late 1990s.

The original Pendolino order was for 54 nine-car units, costing £500million. As originally planned, a pre-series test train was scheduled to be completed and to be in active testing by July 2000, while the first Pendolino was to enter revenue service during March 2001. It was expected that the whole fleet would be delivered by May 2002.

Railtrack, therefore, embarked on a modernisation of the West Coast Main Line to allow for the faster line speeds. However, the programme ran into serious difficulties. By its end, it was almost four times over-budget, had been delayed by a number of years, and had not improved the infrastructure as much as had been planned.

Fiat Ferroviaria introduced its first tilting trains during the 1970s. They were first operated on the Italian railways in 1976. Fiat Ferroviaria supplied much of the content of the Class 390, including the unit's bodyshell and the bogies, while final assembly was carried out at Washwood Heath. The tilting technology was developed by SIG Switzerland (later Fiat-SIG, today Alstom). Each car uses a pair of electromechanical actuators to achieve the desired tilting angle. The train can tilt to a maximum of eight degrees, at which point one side of the train is  higher above the track than the other. In contrast to other Fiat Ferroviaria tilting trains which use hydraulic tilting actuators, the electromechanical system offers lower maintenance cost and higher efficiency.

Design

Overview

The Pendolino is a high-speed electric multiple unit train, which incorporates Fiat Ferroviaria's tilting train Pendolino technology. According to Ian Scoley of the design firm Priestman Goode, the design of the Pendolino is "more reminiscent of an aircraft than a train". A nine-carriage Pendolino reportedly weighs around 471tonnes, which is equivalent to a dozen fully laden lorries. The structure of the Pendolino is largely composed of extruded aluminium panels; allegedly, this material is responsible for the train's exterior surface being considerably smoother than its steel counterparts. The cross-section of the bodyshell is deliberately tapered; this shaping is a necessary requirement imposed by the train's ability to tilt around corners. To avoid the risk of striking passing trains or static structures whilst a carriage is being tilted, it necessitates that the body be narrower towards the top than it is at wheel height.

The nose of the Pendolino is manufactured out of composite materials and moulded in a similar fashion as has been used to produce the shells of racing cars. This construction methodology has been claimed to have been readily compatible with the aerodynamic contouring techniques practised while also retaining considerable structural strength. However, as the design was refined, this was reduced to a tapering length of just  due to design constraints, while a roof fairing extends the curvature rearwards by a further , located directly above and behind the driver's windscreen. To validate its performance, the forward section of the trains was subject to considerable aerodynamic testing to prove its suitability for high-speed operations.

Tilting
The Pendolino features an actively actuated tilt system. Each of the carriages can tilt up to eightdegrees from the horizontal; this is done for the purpose of better managing the forces imposed between high speed trains and the track while traversing corners. On top of this, the lines of the Network Rail network are often canted up to sixdegrees, akin to a shallow-banked cyclodrome; when combined with the Pendolino's tilt system, the train can reportedly comfortably take curves at a 20percent greater speed than it otherwise would be able to do so.

The active tilting mechanism is achieved using electrically operated tilt activators, which are situated under each carriage. Unlike some alternative systems, which are pre-programmed to tilt at sections of a pre-determined route, the Pendolino's tilt system actively detects the upcoming corners using sensors and tilts appropriately to correspond. As tilting may not be appropriate or possible at some locations along the route, such as when travelling close to bridges and tunnels, the tilt mechanism can be disabled by an onboard system, called the Tilt Authorisation and Speed Supervision (TASS). This system relies upon trackside beacons, which are typically spaced around five miles from one another, to transmit data to the train; this information, as well as temporarily locking-out the tilting mechanism from being used on relevant stretches of track, also relays the maximum permissible speeds for the adjacent corners.

Safety
The Pendolino incorporates several different onboard safety systems, including the Automatic Warning System (AWS) and the Train Protection Warning System (TPWS); it was also planned to install compatible equipment for the European Train Control System (ETCS). These systems automatically deliver situational warnings regarding the relevant signals and speed limits to the driver and, if not reacted to appropriately, are able to bring the train to a complete halt. Unlike most trains, it also features a Tilt Authorisation and Speed Supervision (TASS) system, which is used to control the onboard tilting mechanism. In the event of an accident, each Pendolino also incorporates a black box data recorder; another structural measure, designed to help dissipate the forces involved in an incident involving a severe collision, are the crush zones, which can reportedly absorb three times the forces of existing High Speed Trains.

The Pendolino features relatively shallow windows in comparison to trains such as the Voyager; visually, the windows are linked by a black livery line to form a continuous band running along the length of the train. A combination of structural constraints and internal configuration selections had determined the narrowness of the windows; the adoption of larger windows would have intrinsically weakened the bodyshell of each carriage. Reportedly, consideration was given to the adoption of asymmetric window layout during the design process, but this was ultimately discarded in favour of the arrangement used in service instead.

Due to these design choices, the Pendolino has a very high level of structural integrity. Furthermore, the majority of passengers were not even seriously injured due to the carriages' structural properties.

Traction systems 
Traction motors are suspended from the underside of the carriage bodies and connected to the driving wheels using a Cardan shaft and transfer gearbox thus lowering the unsprung mass and consequent track wear at high speeds, a feature inherited from its APT ancestor. Power for each Pendolino is supplied in the form of 25,000voltsAC, and is delivered via the overhead catenary infrastructure installed across its route. A particularly unusual measure, which was adopted to account for the train's tilting ability, is incorporated into the pantograph, the roof-mounted mechanism which connects the train to the overhead wires; it also features an active tilting system, which moves the pantograph to a precise angle in opposition to the direction of the carriages' tilt, allowing contact with the overhead catenary to be smoothly maintained.

Passenger amenities
The Pendolino features a number of amenities and innovations, such as a walk-in shop in place of the traditional buffet/restaurant car and the extensive presence of passenger visual information systems, which are installed on both the inside of the car ends and on the outside of the doors themselves. In response to criticisms of the pressure-operated automatic gangway doors fitted to the Mark 3 and Mark 4 carriages (which could easily be held open by items of luggage resting on the floor sensor, allowing draughts into the passenger saloon), the gangway doors of the Pendolino have press buttons instead. To assist the boarding process, the doors deploy folding steps at stations; this feature is claimed to have been first used on the APT-P.

Originally, every seat had an integrated on-board entertainment system, which featured radio stations, including Virgin Radio, several BBC stations, and a number of pre-recorded music channels. Listings booklets were provided on board and headphones could be purchased at the shop. During March 2010, this system was replaced by onboard WiFi from T-Mobile. First class passengers were provided with a 240 volt mains power socket at each seat.

The Pendolino uses an electronic seat reservations system. Each seat has a small dot-matrix LCD installed near the top. If the seat is reserved, the display shows the station the seat is booked from until the train leaves that station; it subsequently displays "Available unless occupied". The display can also show the name of the passenger if this has been entered at the time of booking. This information is provided by the onboard Train Management System (TMS), which downloads current data via mobile operator Vodafone’s wireless network from the national Customer Reservation System shared by all train operators. The TMS is also used to provide route information to the passenger visual information systems. If a train is rescheduled, the system can rapidly be updated and the displayed information changed to reflect the new schedule.

Consist
The original 53-unit Pendolino fleet was delivered in nine-car formation, with vehicles built at the former Metro-Cammell Washwood Heath plant (by then owned by Alstom), in Birmingham. Thirty-one units were later extended to 11-car formation, with the addition of two new carriages (the 653xx Trailer Standards and the 689xx Motor Standards), built by Alstom at Savigliano in Italy. Units that had been extended were renumbered into the 390/1 range by having 100 added to their original unit numbers (for example, 390003 became 390103). Four additional Savigliano-built 11-car units (nos. 390154–390157) were delivered at the same time, to support service enhancements.

The last two digits of the vehicle number (xx) match the last two digits of the number of the unit to which the vehicle belongs.

Operations

The service introduction of the Pendolino was repeatedly delayed, a fact which has been attributed to the poor project management and the collapse of infrastructure owner Railtrack.

By late 2003, the last of the elderly Class 86 locomotives had been withdrawn from the route.

During 2004, the fleet's sphere of operation was expanded further. This allowed the final Class 90 locomotives to be withdrawn, and inroads were made into the main Class 87 fleet. It was expected that all locomotive-hauled trains would have been replaced by the end of 2004, but the Pendolinos suffered from several technical problems, which granted the Class 87s a temporary reprieve. By January 2005, only eight locomotives remained, for use on peak London Euston to Birmingham New Street services.

This line is not electrified, so Virgin's Class 57/3 Thunderbird diesel locomotives were used to haul the Pendolinos. After Virgin Trains lost the CrossCountry franchise, the company decided to allocate its remaining Class 221 Super Voyagers to the coastal line, ending the practice of hauling Pendolinos from Crewe and thus making several Class 57 locomotives redundant. These locomotives have special Dellner coupling adaptors and electrical systems to make them compatible with Pendolino trains, allowing failed units to be rescued quicker. The Class 57s are also used when engineering works force Pendolino services to run over non-electrified diversionary routes.

The entire Pendolino fleet is allocated to Alstom's Manchester Traincare Centre at Longsight, where heavy maintenance is carried out. Longsight has a hoist on which an entire Pendolino unit can be lifted. Lighter maintenance, cleaning and overnight stabling are carried out at Alstom's other centres: Wembley (London), Oxley (Wolverhampton), Edge Hill (Liverpool) and Polmadie (Glasgow).

On 5 April 2012, the first 11-car Pendolino entered service on the London-Birmingham-Wolverhampton and London-Manchester routes.

Problems and incidents
In October 2004, a train overshot the platform at  station and collided with the buffer stops, and a similar incident occurred a few weeks later at the same station. The Rail Safety and Standards Board's inquiry into the incident identified a software glitch in the wheel-slip protection (WSP) system whereby the train's friction brakes were inhibited at low speeds after prolonged coasting (such as that occurring on approach to a station).

As a result of the smaller cabin dimensions necessitated by the tilting geometry, the higher floor needed to package the tilting mechanisms themselves, and the need to provide disabled toilets, the units have a lower seating capacity than the nine-car Mark 2 and Mark 3 rakes that they replaced. The result has been severe overcrowding on some services, something that Virgin somewhat mitigated through the increased frequency of service, and with the increase to 11-car formations.

The smaller size of the Pendolino windows has attracted comment and, in fact, the window size is unprecedented for British railway rolling stock. The wider window pillars mean that in some standard class carriages, 22.5% of the seats are parallel with either no window or only a limited portion of one, however the roll-over strength of the bodyshell was commented on regarding the crashworthiness performance of the train in the RAIB Accident Report into the derailment at Grayrigg.

Grayrigg derailment

On 23 February 2007, a faulty set of points caused a Virgin Trains Pendolino to derail near Grayrigg in Cumbria. The train's excellent crashworthiness was credited with preventing more fatalities.

The train was formally written off on 30 November 2007, owing to the prohibitive cost of repair against the price of a new unit; a driving car and carriage from the train were subsequently put into use for training purposes at the Virgin Trains Talent Academy in Crewe. Virgin Trains then leased a Class 90, Mk3 coaches and a DVT (Driving Van Trailer), all painted in Virgin's new livery, and nicknamed the "Pretendolino" by Alstom maintenance staff, as a temporary replacement for the train written off. Occasionally, the name even appeared in official communications. Subsequently, the set was handed back to the leasing company.

Speed records 
In September 2006, a Pendolino completed the fastest ever southbound run along the  length of the West Coast Main Line from Glasgow Central to London Euston, at 3hours, 55minutes. The previous record was 4hours, 14minutes, set in 1981 by the Pendolino's ancestor, British Rail's Advanced Passenger Train (APT).

In June 2021, another record-breaking attempt was made with a Pendolino, this time in the northbound direction. The Pendolino made the journey in 3hours, 53minutes, 1second; faster than the 2006 Pendolino run, but narrowly missing the APT's northbound record, which stands at 3hours, 52minutes, 40seconds.

Fleet developments

Additional capacity 
Following a large increase in passenger numbers following the WCML modernisation, the Department for Transport announced a capacity increase by procuring additional units (with one intended to replace the unit damaged at Grayrigg). Four new units have been built with 11 cars, and 31 existing units lengthened to 11 cars.

This required major changes to stations and depots to accommodate the 11-car units. Virgin Rail Projects was set up to introduce these new trains with the new franchise winner as well as Alstom, Network Rail and the current franchise holder, Virgin Trains West Coast, to ensure the new units were able to run from 1 April 2012.

Because Washwood Heath works had closed, the additional vehicles were manufactured in Alstom's Savigliano factory in Italy.

The first new units were built with 11 cars and delivered via the Channel Tunnel to Edge Hill. The first was accepted on 12 July 2011.

In March 2012, unit 390055 operated a test run on the East Coast Main Line from Edinburgh to London King's Cross.

With the franchise process in place, and Virgin Trains' franchise extended until December 2012, the first 11-car unit (390156) entered service on 5 April 2012. The remaining new units were brought into service, and 31 units increased to 11 carriages, over the next eight months. The lengthening project was completed in December 2012.

Reconfiguration of nine-car units 
As part of the subsequent extension of the franchise until April 2017, Virgin Trains made further enhancements to the Pendolinos. The 21 nine-car units each had one first class carriage converted to standard class. This work was completed by September 2015.

Proposed order by Alliance Rail Operations 
However, as the 390s no longer met crashworthiness standards for new trains, a derogation would have been required. With Alliance Rail not able to obtain this, in June 2017 it dropped its plans to purchase 390s.

Avanti West Coast refurbishment 
In December 2019, all 56 trains transferred to Avanti West Coast, operators of the new West Coast Partnership. A major interior refurbishment of the fleet commenced in 2021, involving the replacement of all carpeting and standard-class seats, installation of power sockets at every seat, provision of more luggage space in second class, refitting of the onboard shop, installation of new lighting, and the reupholstering of existing seats in first and standard premium classes. Additionally, one first-class coach in each of the 35 eleven-car 390/1 units is being converted to standard class in order to provide additional capacity. The refurbishment programme is stated to cost £117 million and is expected to run until 2024, with the work being performed by Alstom at Widnes in Cheshire.

The first of the refurbished units returned to service on 25 April 2022.

Fleet details

Liveries 
All units were delivered in Virgin Trains livery of silver bodysides with black areas around the windows, red roofs and red cab-sides with the red areas on the cabs separated from the silver with a curved white band. Doors were originally painted with grey and white stripes. These were re-vinyled in plain grey in 2015.

From September 2017 onwards, the fleet was repainted by Alstom in Widnes into a new livery known as "Flowing Silk", featuring plain white bodysides, black roofs and a vinyl applied red swoosh around the driving cab intended to visually represent a moving piece of silk. The livery was designed to use neutral colours at the behest of the Department for Transport to allow for an easier rebranding. The first unit to wear this livery was 390010. All of the nine-car units were repainted with last to be treated in August 2018, with repaints then commencing on the eleven-car units. The final unit to receive the full Flowing Silk livery in August 2019. Subsequent repaints omitted all Virgin branding in preparation for the end of the franchise in December 2019.

Names 
All 53 of the original units were given cast nameplates in a standard style bearing the word Pendolino on the top of each name although several units were subsequently renamed with similar replacement cast nameplates being fitted. New cast names were applied to the additional four units after they had initially entered service without names.

Cast nameplates were removed from each unit when they were repainted into 'Flowing Silk' in 2017-18, and most of the Virgin-prefixed names have not been re-applied. However, those named after places, people and events have generally had the name re-applied in the form of a vinyl sticker.

List

References

390
Pendolino
High-speed trains of the United Kingdom
Train-related introductions in 2002
Virgin Trains
25 kV AC multiple units